The Var is a river located in the southeast of France.

The Var flows through the Alpes-Maritimes département for most of its length, with a short (~15 km or ~9 mi) stretch in the Alpes-de-Haute-Provence département. It is a unique case in France of a river not flowing in the département named after it (see Var).

Until the beginning of the 19th century, the river had no bridges; it was the border between France and the County of Nice, then part of Kingdom of Piedmont-Sardinia.

Name 
The river name is attested in Latin as Vārus and in Ancient Greek as Ouãros (Οὐᾶρος). It stems from the Indo-European root *uōr- (earlier *uer-), meaning 'water, river' (cf. Sanskrit vār, Old Norse vari).

Hydrography 
The Var rises near the Col de la Cayolle (2,326 m/7,631 ft) in the Maritime Alps and flows generally southeast to its outflow into the Mediterranean Sea between Nice and Saint-Laurent-du-Var. Its main tributaries are the Cians, the Tinée, the Vésubie, the Coulomp, the Estéron, the Tuébi, the Chalvagne, the Barlatte, the Bourdous and the Roudoule.

The Var flows through the following départements and towns: 
Alpes-Maritimes: Guillaumes
Alpes-de-Haute-Provence: Entrevaux
Alpes-Maritimes: Puget-Théniers, Carros, Saint-Laurent-du-Var

References
Bibliography

 

Rivers of France
 
Rivers of Alpes-de-Haute-Provence
Rivers of Alpes-Maritimes
Rivers of Provence-Alpes-Côte d'Azur
Braided rivers in France